Marquard Sebastian Schenk von Stauffenberg (14 May 1644–9 Oct 1693, aged 49) was the Prince-Bishop of Bamberg from 1683 to 1693.

Biography

Marquard Sebastian Schenk von Stauffenberg was born in Eichstätt on 14 May 1644.

He became a canon of Bamberg Cathedral, Würzburg Cathedral, and Augsburg Cathedral. On 10 June 1683 he was elected Prince-Bishop of Bamberg. Pope Innocent XI confirmed his appointment on 2 September 1686. He was ordained as a priest and consecrated as a bishop by Stephan Weinberger, auxiliary bishop of Augsburg, on 6 April 1687.

He received Schloss Greifenstein and rebuilt it in Baroque style, 1691–93, employing the Bavarian architect Leonhard Dientzenhofer. He also commissioned the building of Schloss Seehof.

He died on 9 October 1693.

References

1644 births
1693 deaths
Prince-Bishops of Bamberg
Marquand